My Youthfulness (Chinese: 我的青春谁做主) is a 2009 Chinese television series directed by Zhao Baogang. It is part of the "Youth" trilogy directed by Zhao, which includes Struggle (2007) and Beijing Youth (2012).

Synopsis 
My Youthfulness is a complex story that mainly focuses on the lives of three cousins: Zhao Qingchu (Zhao Ziqi), Qian Xiaoyang (Wang Luodan), and Li Pili (Lin Yuan). Self-assured, confident, yet naive, they make the transition into adulthood. The drama accurately captures the everyday problems faced by young adults both at work and at home and the measures they take to overcome these obstacles.

Cast 
 Lu Yi as Zhou Jin
 Zhao Ziqi as Zhao Qingchu
 Wang Luodan as Qian Xiaoyang
 Zhu Yuchen as Fang Yu
 Lin Yuan as Li Pili 
 Zhang Yi as Gao Qi
 Su Xiaoming as Yang Er
 Gai Ke as Yang Yi
 Fang Zige as Li Bohuai
 Cong Shan as Yang Shan
 Li Ranran as Lang Xinping
 Bai Baihe as Lei Lei

Soundtrack

Awards

References

External links 
My Youthfulness Official Website

2009 Chinese television series debuts
Chinese drama television series
Chinese romance television series
2009 Chinese television series endings
China Central Television original programming